This is a list of mines in Brazil organized by mineral.

Bauxite

Paragominas mine — Pará

Gold

Chapada — Goiás
Jacobina mine — Bahia
Morro Velho — Nova Lima, Minas Gerais
Paracatu — Minas Gerais
Serra Grande — Crixás, Goiás
Serra Pelada — Pará

Iron ore

Alegria mine — Minas Gerais
Anglo Ferrous Metals (AFM) Minas-Rio Project — Minas Gerais
Carajás Mine — Parauapebas, Pará
Corumbá (mine) — Corumbá, Mato Grosso do Sul
Serra Sul (S11D) — near Canaã dos Carajás, Pará

Manganese

Azul mine — Pará

Tungsten

Currais Novos — Northeast Region, Brazil

See also
List of mines
List of companies of Brazil

Mines in Brazil
Brazil
Mines